Tsering Dolma Gyaltong was a Tibetan spiritual leader living in exile in Toronto, Ontario, Canada. Tsering was active in being a Founding Member of the Tibetan Women's Association and re-establishing it again in 1984.

She was active in her open criticism of China's treatment of Tibetans.

Tsering was a member of the International Council of 13 Indigenous Grandmothers - a group of spiritual elders, medicine women and wisdom keepers until her death in 2018.

Life
On the 17th of March 1959, the day that the Dalai Lama began his escape from the Norbulingka Palace, The Tibetan Women's Association, of which Tsering was a Founding Member carried out a street demonstration with 500 of its members due to the Invasion of Tibet by the Chinese and the ongoing treatment of the Tibetans. Due to this, Tsering is said to have been 'instrumental' in creating the diversion to get the Dalai Lama out of Tibet in 1959. Tsering's husband had a role in lobbying for support for Tibet from other governments. Because of this, Tsering and her family had to leave Chinese-occupied Tibet. Tsering followed the Dalai Lama into exile in India.

Tsering moved with her family to Canada in 1972 where she lived in Toronto.

In 1984, Tsering came back to India to reinstate the central Tibetan Women's Association. Tsering took on many roles on the Executive Committee - spanning 10 years; Vice President from 1985–1988, Special Assistant from 1988–1991, Vice President from June–October in 1992 and President from 1993–1994.

Fourth World Women’s Conference
Tsering and two other Canadian Tibetan Refugees were joined by Tibetan delegates from Australia, Norway, Sweden, the United Kingdom, and the United States in order to attend the Fourth World Conference on Women which, in 1985, was held in Beijing, China. Here, Tsering and her fellow delegates criticised China's treatment of Tibetans, especially women.

Due to the heavy-handedness of Chinese security, and Tsering's outspokenness and the publicity actions of other members of the Tibetan Women's Delegation, the event was seen as a public relations disaster for China.

Another success was that they were able to meet with hundreds of other international female delegates. They were able to network and get their message heard internationally.

The International Council of 13 Grandmothers

In 2004, Tsering was approached by The Center for Sacred Studies to serve on the International Council of 13 Indigenous Grandmothers.

The council has been active in protecting indigenous rights and medicines, and promoting indigenous wisdom traditions. In 2006, Tsering Dolma Gyaltong hosted a visit by the Grandmothers to Dharamshala, where they presented a sacred condor feather to the Dalai Lama, held prayers for world peace, and "emphasised on protection of the diverse cultural heritage in the form of different languages, medicine and ceremonies."

Notes

References 
Grandmothers' Council website about the Grandmothers 
Native Village Publications,  
Sacred Studies, Grandmother's Biographies
Schaefer, C, (2006) Grandmothers Council the World: wise women elders offer their vision for our planet. Trumpeter Books 978-1-59030-293-4
Supriano, S, Steppin’ Out of Babylon. (2009-04-06) Interview with Agnes Baker Pilgrim - Chairperson of the International Council of 13 Indigenous Grandmothers and the oldest living member of the Takilma Siletz nation of Southern Oregon 
Tibetan Women's Association, Creation. 
Tibetan Women's Association, (2006-10-13), Fourth International Council of Thirteen Indigenous Grandmothers 
Tibetan Women's Association, Former Executives
Tibetan Women's Association, Dolma (Publication), English Version, 2009
Tibet Women's Delegation (1996) Dialogue Between Nations

External links 
 International Council of 13 of Indigenous Grandmothers Official Website
 Official website for documentary
 For The Next Seven Generations Film Trailer
 The Center for Sacred Studies
 Statement of the International Council of Thirteen Indigenous Grandmothers
 Official Tibetan Women's Association website
 Tibetan Women's Delegation Report on UN 4th World Conference on Women 1995
 Canada Tibet Committee website
 Grandmother TSERING DOLMA GYALTONG

Tibetan humanitarians
Sustainability advocates
1930 births
2018 deaths
Canadian people of Tibetan descent